Ram Narayan Dudi former Member of Parliament, Rajya Sabha. He was the Revenue, Colonisation & Soldier Welfare minister in BJP Government of Rajasthan from 2003 to 2008. He was born on  10 September 1948 in the family of Ganga Ram Dudi at village Ratkuria in Jodhpur district in Rajasthan. He did  MA in history.

External links 

  Election Commission of India Partywise Comparison Since 1977 Bilada Constituency
Rajasthan Legislative Assembly 12th House - Constituency Representation 
Rajasthan Government Directory
Rajasthan Government Cabinet

Rajasthani politicians
Rajya Sabha members from Rajasthan
1948 births
Living people
State cabinet ministers of Rajasthan
Bharatiya Janata Party politicians from Rajasthan
Rajya Sabha members from the Bharatiya Janata Party